Moron is a commune in the Jérémie Arrondissement, in the Grand'Anse department of Haiti. It has 24,713 inhabitants (in 2003).

Villages located within the commune include: Moron, Gros Morne, La Roche, Layalace, Lenaire, Plik and Sources Chaudes.

References

Populated places in Grand'Anse (department)
Communes of Haiti